Trichopteryx is a genus of moths in the family Geometridae erected by the German entomologist, Jacob Hübner in 1825.

Species
 Trichopteryx carpinata (Borkhausen, 1794)
 Trichopteryx exportata (Staudinger, 1897)
 Trichopteryx fastuosa Inoue, 1958
 Trichopteryx fui Yazaki, 2002
 Trichopteryx fusconotata Hashimoto, 1983
 Trichopteryx grisearia (Leech, 1897)
 Trichopteryx hemana (Butler, 1878)
 Trichopteryx polycommata (Denis & Schiffermüller, 1775)
 Trichopteryx potopolskii Viidalepp, 1988
 Trichopteryx terranea (Butler, 1879)
 Trichopteryx ussurica (Wehrli, 1927)
 Trichopteryx veritata Pearsall, 1907

References 
 Natural History Museum Lepidoptera genus database
Trichopteryx at funet

Trichopterygini
Taxa named by Jacob Hübner